Yeovil Junction railway station is the busier, but less central, of two railway stations serving the town of Yeovil in England. The station is  outside the town, in the village of Stoford. Although Yeovil is in Somerset, the station was in Dorset until 1991.

It was opened by the London and South Western Railway in 1860 on its London to Exeter line now known as the West of England Main Line. Today it is managed by South Western Railway and is also the home of the Yeovil Railway Centre.

History

Just a few weeks later, on 19 July, the London and South Western Railway (LSWR) opened its Yeovil and Exeter line. This left the S&YR at Bradford Abbas Junction and crossed over the GWR line to its own station at Yeovil Junction, and then continued on towards Exeter Queen Street. The station was a junction because another line led back to join the S&YR at River Junction, so trains could run from Exeter direct to Hendford (the terminus was moved to a joint B&ER/LSWR Yeovil Town railway station from 1 June 1861). The original eastwards connection from River Junction to Bradford Abbas was closed in 1870, after which most main line trains only called at Yeovil Junction where passengers could change onto a connecting train for the short journey to Yeovil Town. The LSWR operated all trains over the S&YR and bought the smaller company in 1878.

The station at this time had two platforms serving three tracks. Goods traffic was handled on the north side of the main line, and a turntable was placed on the south side. On 13 June 1864 a new line was opened from the GWR up to a goods station at Clifton Maybank on the south side of the LSWR station. The GWR was, until 1874, a  broad gauge line and broad and standard gauge wagons could be brought alongside each other at Clifton Maybank to allow goods to be transhipped between them.

Work started in 1907 to enlarge the station and was completed in 1909. The  southern platform also had two tracks, the northern face for westbound trains and the opposite side was  a goods siding. Two through tracks also passed between the platforms for non-stop trains. A footbridge at the west end connected the two platforms and extended over the branch track to the station forecourt. A second footbridge was erected at the east end of the station but was dismantled in 1920 and moved up the line to Overton railway station. The goods yard was also extended in 1908 and new sidings were laid near the GWR exchange siding. The cost of the work was in excess of £47,000.

The LSWR became a part of the Southern Railway (SR) in 1923 as a result of the Railways Act 1921. The GWR’s Clifton Maybank branch closed on 7 June 1937. Wagons would in future be exchanged at Yeovil Town, but the GWR had to build a road for Mr Paul, the owner of a private siding which had connected with their line, so that he could bring his goods to the Clifton Maybank platform instead which was still served by the SR.

This was opened on 13 October 1943 and offered a new route for trains of war materials as well as a diversion route in the event of bomb damage.

On 1 January 1948 the Southern Railway was nationalised to become the Southern Region of British Railways. January 1963 saw all the lines in the area transferred to the Western Region and this was soon followed by the Reshaping of British Railways report. Yeovil Town closed to passengers on 2 October 1966, the branch service then operated to Pen Mill until it was withdrawn entirely on 4 May 1968. This soon proved a rationalisation too far and the double track was restored between Sherborne and Yeovil Junction on 1 October 1967 but all trains had to use the eastbound main line platform. On 26 March 1975 the former branch platform was reopened as a through line so that two trains could use the station at the same time. A limited passenger service to Yeovil Pen Mill was reinstated in 2015 since when this has gradually increased in frequency.

A permanent way depot was established in the old goods yard on the north side of the station in 1965. A small Ruston and Hornsby four-wheel diesel locomotive number DS1169 was kept here for shunting until 1972. In 2001 the area was used by the Somerset and Dorset Locomotive Company as a depot for its fleet of hire locomotives, although this use has now ceased. The turntable has been retained on the south side of the line and is often used for turning the locomotives of steam-hauled excursions. This and the Clifton Maybank site has been the home of the Yeovil Railway Centre since 1993.

Signalling 
The first signal boxes were built in 1875. "Yeovil Junction No. 1" was on the north side of the line at the west of the station, and "Yeovil Junction No. 2" was at the opposite end. When the station was rebuilt in 1908 the No. 1 Box was replaced by a new 60-lever "Yeovil Junction East" situated between the main and branch lines; No. 2 box was extended and renamed "Yeovil Junction West". The latter was damaged in an accident on 20 August 1918 but was rebuilt. At the end of 1949 they were renamed again, the East Box becoming "Yeovil Junction A" and the West Box "Yeovil Junction B"

The 1967 rationalisation saw the closure of the B Box on 30 April but the A Box was retained to control movements on the branch to Yeovil Town and Pen Mill. A siding connection to the main line was controlled by "Yeovil Junction West Ground Frame", while "Yeovil Junction East Ground Frame" was used for a connection to the sidings on the south side of the main line. When the double track was reinstated to Sherborne the signal box frame was replaced with a Western Region one of 44 levers.

The remaining box was closed in March 2012, when the line between Salisbury and Exmouth Junction was re-signalled.  Signalling here is now supervised from Basingstoke Rail Operating Centre.

Accidents and incidents
There have been a number of accidents at Yeovil Junction over the years, although most were minor with few injuries.
 20 September 1860 – the rear coach of a Yeovil Junction to Hendford train derailed on the points leading onto the branch.
 October 1860 – a goods train going towards Hendford collided with a passenger train coming the other way.
 12 June 1886 – a collision between a goods train and a passenger train to Yeovil Town due to confusing signals.
 13 July 1887 – a locomotive collided with the coaches to which it was going to couple, knocking them almost  along the track and injuring nine passengers.
 26 July 1887 – an empty passenger carriage derailed while it was being added to a London train.
 4 July 1914 – a coupling of an eastbound goods train broke. The rear part collided with the front  from Yeovil Junction, knocking the wooden upper storey off the West signal box.
 20 August 1918 – a collision between locomotives occurred due to the signalman not following rules.

Location
The entrance to the station is across the footbridge from the car park on the north side of the line. The garage in the middle of the car park is the station’s original goods shed, and the remaining goods sidings are at the end of the car park. Descending from the footbridge to the platform brings passengers to the main station offices, which are built from red bricks with red glazed abutments. A second similar building at the east end of the platform is the station buffet which still contains its original (1908) counter. Now known as "Peppers", in 2009 it appeared in a list of "highly commended" station cafes published in The Guardian but came under new management in 2011.

Platform layout 
Tracks serve both sides of the platform and are each signalled for trains to run in either direction.

Beyond the east end of the platform was the signal box, now demolished. The tracks to London are on its right, and the single track to Yeovil Pen Mill is on its left. No regular passenger services operated over this route from 1968 until December 2015 when a limited service was introduced between London Waterloo and Yeovil Pen Mill via Yeovil Junction.

Opposite the main platform the old eastbound through line has been lifted but the westbound line is retained as a siding, accessible only from the east end of the station.  Beyond is the old westbound platform which is no longer connected to the main station but is used by occasional visiting steam trains and by the Yeovil Railway Centre which lies to the south. The turntable is at the right of their railway centre. It makes use of tracks to the left which are on the site of the old GWR Clifton Maybank goods depot. At the far end is a raised earthwork that looks like it once carried another siding, but it is in fact part of the original scheme of 1864 which envisaged another link from Clifton Maybank southwards towards  which was never completed.

Services

There are bus services to Yeovil and the nearby village of Barwick, these are provided by South West Coaches service 68.
Connection by bus to Yeovil Pen Mill is accessible via a change at Yeovil Bus Station (using South West Coaches Services 68 & 70). This runs roughly 0700 to 1810 Monday to Saturday (except Public Holidays).

See also

 Southern Railway routes west of Salisbury

References

Buildings and structures in Yeovil
Railway stations in Somerset
Former London and South Western Railway stations
Railway stations in Great Britain opened in 1860
Railway stations served by South Western Railway
Rail junctions in England
DfT Category D stations